Youngstown Air Reserve Station (sometimes abbreviated as YARS)  is a military facility located in Vienna Township, Trumbull County, Ohio, 11 miles north of Youngstown and 10 miles east of Warren in the United States. The installation is located at Youngstown–Warren Regional Airport. The host wing for the installation is the 910th Airlift Wing (910 AW), an Air Force Reserve Command unit operationally gained by the Air Mobility Command.

Mission 
Youngstown ARS is located at the Youngstown–Warren Regional Airport. Its primary mission is to serve as home of the 910 AW, and its eight C-130H Hercules aircraft operated by one C-130 squadron. The 910 AW is a unique organization in the Air Force in that a portion of the wing's mission is devoted to the Department of Defense's only fixed-wing aerial spray mission.

As of 2022, these aircraft will be replaced by C-130J Hercules after an eight-year effort to do so.

Staffing 
The 910 AW has nearly 1,450 military personnel – around 300 air reserve technician (ART) personnel, augmented by roughly 1,150 "traditional" part-time Air Force reservists - and 150 full-time civilians. The installation also hosts a Navy Operational Support Center and a collocated Marine Corps Reserve Center that are home to Navy and Marine Corps reservists.

History 
The history of Youngstown ARS dates to the early 1950s, when it was originally opened as Youngstown Air Force Base. Beginning in 1951, the Air Defense Command (ADC) began negotiations with the local community to construct an Air Force base to defend the north-central United States. Negotiations were finalized and the new base was dedicated on 11 August 1952.

The housekeeping unit of the new $10 million air defense base was the 88th Air Base Squadron, with ADC's 86th Fighter-Interceptor Squadron being the operational unit flying F-84C Thunderjets. Assigned to ADC's Central Air Defense Force, the 86th would remain at Youngstown until 1960, eventually upgrading to the F-102 Delta Dagger. On 18 August 1955, the 30th Air Division, 79th Fighter Group (Air Defense) was assigned to Youngstown AFB.

On 26 May 1952, the Air Force Reserve's 26th Fighter-Bomber Squadron was assigned to Youngstown. Formerly a troop carrier squadron, the unit had been activated during the Korean War, and after being inactivated, was assigned to Youngstown as a reserve T-33 Shooting Star squadron. The 26th FBS received F-86H Sabres in 1958, but shortly afterward was inactivated and redesignated as the 757th Troop Carrier Squadron. The F-86s had been received, but never flown while they were going through acceptance checks, and the T-33s, which were flying, were taken out and replaced by C-119 Flying Boxcars

In 1959, the need for active-duty Air Defense Command bases and regular Air Force fighter-interceptor operations were diminishing and the intent to scale back operations at Youngstown AFB was announced on 28 October 1959. The Air Force transferred command of Youngstown AFB to Continental Air Command (now the Air Force Reserve Command) on 1 March 1960 and the 79th Fighter Group was inactivated that date.

As Youngstown–Warren ARS, the installation has 59 operational buildings, primarily aviation maintenance, training, and administrative facilities. While it has dormitories for temporary lodging, no permanent housing is available on the installation.

The current host wing, the 910 AW, traces its lineage at Youngstown to 1963, when it was established as the 910th Troop Carrier Group flying the C-119 Flying Boxcar. The group later trained as a forward air control/tactical air support group from 1970 to 1971, as an air support special operations group from 1971 to 1973, and as a fighter group from 1973 to 1981, during which time it operated the A-37 Dragonfly and U-3 Blue Canoe and was operationally gained by the TAC. It converted to an airlift mission in 1981 and received its first C-130 aircraft on 27 March 1981, when it became the 910th Tactical Airlift Group and operationally gained by the Military Airlift Command (MAC).

In January 1992, the 910 TAG became the only full-time, fixed-wing aerial spray unit in the Department of Defense. In June of that year, as part of an Air Force-wide reorganization, MAC was disestablished and the unit was renamed the 910th Airlift Group, operationally-gained by the newly established Air Mobility Command (AMC).

In 1997, the Air Force Reserve became a separate major command  in the Air Force organizational structure as Air Force Reserve Command (AFRC). Per AFRC direction, the unit was renamed the 910th Airlift Wing (910 AW) while still retaining its operational relationship with AMC.

See also 

 Aerospace Defense Command Fighter Squadrons

References

Further reading
 Maurer, Maurer. Air Force Combat Units of World War II. Washington, DC: U.S. Government Printing Office 1961 (republished 1983, Office of Air Force History).
 Ravenstein, Charles A. Air Force Combat Wings Lineage and Honors Histories 1947–1977. Maxwell Air Force Base, Alabama: Office of Air Force History 1984. .
 
  A Handbook of Aerospace Defense Organization 1946 – 1980, by Lloyd H. Cornett and Mildred W. Johnson, Office of History, Aerospace Defense Center, Peterson Air Force Base, Colorado

External links
Youngstown–Warren Air Reserve Station

Installations of the United States Air Force in Ohio
Military installations established in 1960
Buildings and structures in Trumbull County, Ohio